The 1973 Summer Universiade, also known as the VII Summer Universiade, took place in Moscow, Soviet Union.

Sports and venues at the 1973 Summer Universiade 
  (Central Lenin Stadium)
  (Sport Palace of the Central Lenin Stadium)
  (Tchaika Pool)
  (Sport Palace of the Central Lenin Stadium)
  (Znamenskie Brother ring)
  (Lenin Stadium Pool)
  (Tennis City of the Central Lenin Stadium)
  (Sokolniki Palace)
  (Swimming Palace)
  (University Ring)

Medal table

References

 
1973
U
Summer Universiade
Universiade
Universiade
Multi-sport events in the Soviet Union
1973 in Moscow
Summer Universiade